Sarykemer (Sarykemer) is an auyl in southeastern Kazakhstan. It is the seat of Bayzak District of Jambyl Region. Population: .

References 

Populated places in Jambyl Region